Shakhram Djamshedovich Giyasov (born 7 July 1993) is an Uzbek professional boxer. As an amateur he won a silver medal at the 2016 Summer Olympics as a welterweight.

Amateur career

Olympic result
Rio 2016
Round of 32: Defeated Youba Sissokho (Spain) 3–0
Round of 16: Defeated Eimantas Stanionis (Lithuania) 3–0
Quarter-finals: Defeated Roniel Iglesias (Cuba) 3–0
Semi-finals: Defeated Mohammed Rabii (Morocco) 3–0
Final: Defeated by Daniyar Yeleussinov (Kazakhstan) 3–0

World Championships result
Hamburg 2017
Round of 16: Defeated Yevhenii Barabanov (Ukraine) 5–0
Quarter-finals: Defeated Pat McCormack (England) 5–0
Semi-finals: Defeated Ablaikhan Zhussupov (Kazakhstan) 4–1
Final: Defeated Roniel Iglesias (Cuba) 5–0

Professional career

Early career

Giyasov vs. Velazquez 
On 10 March 2018, Giyasov made his professional debut against Nicolas Atilio Velazquez of Argentina. Giyasov won the fight after knocking Velazquez out with a left hook to the body within the first minute of the opening round.

Giyasov vs. Gorbics 
On 21 April 2018 Giyasov fought in his second professional fight, he was taken the distance by Gabor Gorbics on route to a unanimous decision win. He stated after the fight that “I was over excited because of the crowd, and I was rushing myself to get a KO. But it was a great experience though. I’m confident that today I would stop him without question”.

Giyasov vs. Echeverria 
On 14 July 2018, Giyasov gained his second knockout win by defeating Daniel Echeverria in the opening round. Giyasov hit Echeverria with a strong body shot which dropped the Mexican fighter, referee Raul Caiz Sr proceeded to stop the fight despite protests from the corner of Echeverria.

Giyasov vs. Mensah 
Giyasov's fourth professional fight was against Albert Mensah on 17 August 2018. In the third round, Giyasov landed a combination of punches to the body and head of Mensah which put the Ghanaian on the canvas. Giyasov was declared the winner after Mensah was unable to get up before the count of ten.

Giyasov vs. Laguna 
On 22 September 2018, Giyasov fought against the undefeated Nicaraguan Julio Laguna on the undercard of Anthony Joshua vs. Alexander Povetkin. Despite the initial toughness of Laguna, Giyasov slowly wore down his opponent with a barrage of punches and knocked Laguna out with a right hook to the head during the fourth round.

Giyasov vs. Zamudio 
On 24 November 2018, Giyasov fought against the experienced Mexican Miguel Zamudio. Giyasov dropped his opponent with a left hook seconds into the opening round and repeatedly managed to hit Zamudio. Eventually Giyasov hit Zamudio with a barrage of punches which resulted in his opponent dropping to the canvas for a second time in the opening round, following the second knock down, referee David Fields stopped the fight.

Giyasov vs. Puerta 
Giyasov's seventh professional fight was against Edgar Puerta on 23 February 2019. Giyasov won via fifth round technical knockout after hitting Puerta with several heavy blows.

On 25 April 2019, it was announced that Giyasov had signed a contract with Matchroom Sport where he would be promoted by Eddie Hearn.

Giyasov vs. Taylor 
On 26 April 2019, Giyasov was taken the distance for just the second time in his professional career when he fought Emanuel Taylor over ten rounds. Giyasov was hurt in both the first and fourth rounds and this resulted in him been forced to clinch Taylor. Giyasov started to control the middle rounds and hurt Taylor in the ninth round and despite a close final round, Giyasov was announced as the winner via unanimous decision.

Giyasov vs. Perez 
On 24 August 2019, Giyasov fought former WBA lightweight champion Darleys Pérez in what was expected to be Giyasov's most difficult fight to date of his professional career. Giyasov knocked Pérez out within the first thirty seconds of the opening round after hitting his opponent cleanly with a left hook to the head. Pérez hesitantly got to his feet before referee Francisco Laveaga stopped the fight.

Giyasov vs. Campos 
Almost a year after his last fight, Giyasov returned to the ring against Wiston Campos on 15 August 2020. After dominating the opening two rounds, Giyasov put his opponent on the canvas after landing a heavy left hook to the body of Campos at the end of the third round. Giyasov was declared the winner after Campos was unable to get up before the count of ten.

Giyasov vs. Moreno 
On 3 April 2021, Giyasov fought in his home nation of Uzbekistan for the first time as a professional. The bout would take place in the nations capital Tashkent, against Patricio Lopez Moreno. Giyasov started the fight aggressively and at the end of the second round, landed a combination of punches which momentarily put Moreno on the canvas. Moreno managed to recover from the knockdown, however Giyasov continued pressurising his Mexican opponent and with just under a minute of the third round remaining, connected with a heavy right hand to the head which put Moreno on the canvas for the second time. This resulted in referee Andriy Baliasov ending the bout after Moreno couldn’t recover before the count of ten.

Giyasov vs. Coria 
On 17 December 2021, Giyasov fought against Cristian Rafael Coria. During the second round, Coria appeared to knock Giyasov down, however this wasn’t ruled a knockdown by the referee. Giyasov won via unanimous decision, 100-90, 99-91 and 99-91 on the scorecards, after controlling the remainder of the bout.

Giyasov vs. Gomez 
Giyasov fought against Christian Gomez on the undercard of Canelo Álvarez vs. Dmitry Bivol on 7 May 2022. In the fourth round, Giyasov landed a left hook which put his opponent on the canvas. During the seventh round, Giyasov knocked Gomez down for a second time after landing a short right uppercut. Gomez managed to recover from the knockdown and towards the end of the seventh round, landed a right hand which appeared to visibly hurt Giyasov. In the final round, Giyasov knocked Gomez down for a third time after landing another right uppercut. Gomez got off the canvas for a third time and was able to make it to the end of the bout. Giyasov was announced as the winner via wide unanimous decision, 99-88, 98-89 and 99-88 on the scorecards.

Professional boxing record

References

External links

 
 Shakhram Giyasov at World Series of Boxing
 Shakhram Giyasov - Profile, News Archive & Current Rankings at Box.Live
 

1993 births
Living people
Uzbekistani male boxers
Olympic boxers of Uzbekistan
Boxers at the 2016 Summer Olympics
Place of birth missing (living people)
Medalists at the 2016 Summer Olympics
Olympic silver medalists for Uzbekistan
Olympic medalists in boxing
AIBA World Boxing Championships medalists
Light-welterweight boxers
Welterweight boxers